Sir Silas Atopare  (1951 – 16 September 2021) was a Papua New Guinean politician who served as the seventh governor-general of Papua New Guinea from November 1997 until November 2003.

Early life and education 
Atopare was born in Kabiufa, near Goroka in what is now the Eastern Highlands Province of Papua New Guinea. He attended Kabiufa Primary School, which was a Seventh-day Adventist Church school and then went to Kambubu Adventist High School in East New Britain Province. He always remained a member of the Adventist Church. 

In 1967, he joined the Department of Agriculture and Livestock and in 1974 he became a coffee plantation manager. A keen rugby player he formed the Asaro Hawks, which was the first team of Papua New Guineans to compete in the largely expatriate Goroka Rugby League.

Political career 
In 1977, at the age of 25, he was elected to the National Parliament of Papua New Guinea, representing Goroka but failed to be re-elected in 1982. He subsequently held many roles, including being a board member of Air Niugini. In January 1989 he was appointed inaugural Chairman of the Eastern Highlands Capital Authority set up by the Provincial Government to manage the provision of urban services for the town of Goroka (until 1992) in the course of which Goroka town was restored to be the best serviced urban centre in PNG, and president of the Goroka Show Society. 

In 1991, he was made secretary-general of the PNG Smallholder Coffee Growers Association and, in 1997, was appointed as governor-general. 

In 1998, he was knighted as a Knight Grand Cross of the Order of St Michael and St George. He had to bring order when violence and controversy marred the electoral process in PNG's oil and gas rich Southern Highlands Province. In 2008, Atopare was appointed Grand Chief in the Order of Logohu.

Atopare died in Goroka on 16 September 2021, during the 46th Independence Day celebrations. A state funeral was held in Port Moresby.

References 

1951 births
2021 deaths
Governors-General of Papua New Guinea
Knights Grand Cross of the Order of St Michael and St George
Papua New Guinean knights
Papua New Guinean Seventh-day Adventists
People from the Eastern Highlands Province
Grand Companions of the Order of Logohu